This article details the Widnes Vikings rugby league football club's 2012 season. This is the seventeenth season of the Super League era.

Season review

March 2011

The Rugby Football League announced that the Vikings' application had been accepted and would be accepted into Super League XVII.

April 2011

Widnes give Prop Ben Kavanagh a 3-year Super League deal making him the first current player to get a new Super League contract.

June 2011

It was announced that the Vikings would keep current players Paddy Flynn and Steve Pickersgill through the 2012 season on their existing deals.

July 2011

Widnes announced the capture of Wigan Warriors Prop Ben Cross (formerly of Leeds Rhinos) on a one-year deal; they also recruited Second Rower Hep Cahill form Crusaders on a three-year deal. Another signing for the Vikings came in the form of off of contract Hull Kingston Rovers fullback Shaun Briscoe, also current player Macgraff Leuluai signed a two-year Super League deal after impressing the coaching staff in 2011. Three more current Widnes players signed Super League contracts: David Allen on a two-year deal, Thomas Coyle on a two-year deal and Kurt Haggerty on a one-year deal with the option of another year.

August 2011

The Vikings signed New Zealand winger Patrick Ah Van from the Bradford Bulls on a two-year deal. Other new signings include Frank Winterstein on a 2-year deal from Crusaders, also his teammate Lloyd White joins Widnes on a 3-year deal. Wakefield Trinity Wildcats centre Chris Dean was announced on a 2-year deal while Wigan Warriors prop Ben Davies also signs for 2 years. Widnes have also promoted youngsters Jack Owens, Danny Craven and Tom Gilmore to full-time contracts with the Vikings.

September 2011

Widnes announce the signing of Castleford Tigers centre Willie Isa on a 2 Year Deal. The Vikings released Dean Gaskell, Richard Varkulis, Gareth Haggerty, Danny Hulme, Shane Grady, Chris Lunt, Chaz I'Anson, Matt Gardner, Greg Scott, Daniel Heckenberg, Danny Sculthorpe, Tangi Ropati and Dave Houghton.

October 2011

There was no news for October.

November 2011

The 2012 Super League fixtures were announced with Widnes taking on Wakefield Trinity Wildcats at the Stobart Stadium on 3 February; this match was selected to be on Sky Sports. It marked the Vikings' first Super League game since 2005. Widnes signed centre Stefan Marsh on a one-year loan deal from fellow Super League club Wigan Warriors.

December 2011

The 2012 squad numbers were released. The Vikings lost their Boxing Day friendly 32–18 against arch rivals Warrington Wolves, the Vikings tries came from Scott Moore, Thomas Coyle and Danny Craven, Patrick Ah Van kicked all 3 goals.

January 2012

Widnes started 2012 with a 28–6 win over Championship team Swinton Lions. Paddy Flynn, Stefan Marsh, Kurt Haggerty, Rhys Hanbury and Danny Craven all scored a try each for the Vikings whilst Patrick Ah Van kicked a goal, Craven kicked a goal and Lloyd White finished with 2 goals. The Vikings signed ex-Wigan Warriors fullback Cameron Phelps on a 2 Year Deal. Widnes had the honour of being St Helens R.F.C.'s first opponents at Langtree Park, however they went down 42–24 after a spirited performance, wingman Paddy Flynn scored a hat-trick while Stefan Marsh and Rhys Hanbury also crossed the try-line, Ah Van converted 2 of the tries. It was announced that the Vikings had captured Melbourne Storm prop Sione Kite on a two-year deal.

February 2012

Widnes kicked off their first year back in the Super League with a 32–14 loss to new-look Wakefield Trinity Wildcats, the Vikings looked good and took the lead with tries from Danny Craven, Patrick Ah Van and Hep Cahill with Ah Van kicking a goal however they surrendered to a late Wakefield fightback. The Vikings were destroyed by a rampant Huddersfield Giants side, the Giants came away with a 66–6 win with Widnes' sole try coming from Paddy Flynn while Ah Van kicked the goal. Widnes lost 38–18 to Salford City Reds with Ah Van scoring 2 tries and 2 goals with Flynn also scoring. Rhys Hanbury also kicked a goal. The Vikings were beaten 44–16 by the champions Leeds Rhinos, Ah Van, Hanbury and Flynn all crossed for tries whilst Ah Van kicked 2 goals.

March 2012

March did not start well for the Vikings as they lost 36–0 to Hull Kingston Rovers. However the week after the Vikings recorded their first win of the season and what a shock it was, trailing 36–18 with 30 minutes to go Widnes came back and beat Wigan Warriors 37–36 with Paddy Flynn, Stefan Marsh, Shaun Briscoe (2), Lloyd White and Frank Winterstein all scoring tries, on loan Gareth O'Brien kicked all 6 goals and White finished the scoring with a drop-goal. This victory was short lived after Hull F.C. dominated the Vikings the very next week, the game finished 58–10 in Hull's favour and Widnes got over through Fylnn twice, O'Brien added a goal. The Vikings recorded their 2nd win of the season by beating London Broncos 38–30 with White scoring 2 tries, Chris Dean, Rhys Hanbury, Ben Davies and Cameron Phelps all scoring and O'Brien added 7 goals. Widnes were losers in France when Catalans Dragons beat them 76–6 with Sione Kite scoring for the Vikings and O'Brien converting.

April 2012

Widnes started the Easter period with a 46–12 loss to local rivals Warrington Wolves, Chris Dean and David Allen both crossed for the Vikings with Patrick Ah Van converting both. The Vikings were outplayed by the Bradford Bulls and lost 38–4 with Rhys Hanbury crossing for their sole try. Widnes bowed out of the Challenge Cup but not before giving St Helens R.F.C. a massive scare by coming from 40–16 to just lose 40–38. Ah Van scored 2 tries and Lloyd White also crossed for 2, Kurt Haggerty, Hanbury and Hep Cahill also scored for the Vikings. Ah Van kicked 5 goals from 7 attempts. Wigan Warriors youngster Joe Mellor joined the Vikings on a months loan whilst hooker Scott Moore is sacked by Widnes and was snapped up by Huddersfield Giants. Widnes lost to St Helens R.F.C. for the 2nd time in 2 weeks but this time didn't get anywhere close to the Saints as they lost 62–0.

May 2012

Widnes kicked off May with the announcement that Anthony Watts signed a 1-year extension keeping him at the Vikings until the end of 2013 also prop/second rower Anthony Mullally rejects a contract extension. Meanwhile, Paddy Flynn signs a 2-year extension with the Vikings keeping him at the Stobart Stadium until the end of 2014. Widnes lost yet another game, this time they lost 36–12 to fellow strugglers Castleford Tigers, Flynn and Stefan Marsh both scored tries and Rhys Hanbury kicked 2 goals. Widnes lost a close game 42–34 to Catalans Dragons, Marsh, Joe Mellor, Hanbury, Chris Dean, David Allen and Patrick Ah Van all scored tries whilst Hanbury kicked 5 goals. Widnes announce that Huddersfield Giants captain Kevin Brown will be playing for them in 2013. Leeds Rhinos hooker Paul McShane signs with the Vikings on a months loan.

June 2012

Widnes recorded their 3rd win of the season with a 26–22 win over the Huddersfield Giants, Patrick Ah Van, Rhys Hanbury, Ben Cross and Cameron Phelps all scored tries whilst Ah Van kicked 5 goals. Widnes lost to fellow basement battlers London Broncos 28–24 with Phelps scoring 2 tries and Frank Winterstein also scoring 2 and Ah Van kicked all 4 goals. Widnes suffered a 54–12 loss at the hands of Wigan Warriors, Cross scored his 2nd career try and Joe Mellor also scored against his parent club, Ah Van kicked both goals.

July 2012

Widnes announce the immediate signing of Hull F.C. prop Eamon O'Carroll on a 2 and a half-year deal. The Vikings had their best victory of the season when they beat Castleford Tigers 40–10. Stefan Marsh, Frank Winterstein, Ben Davies, Paul McShane, Joe Mellor, Eamon O'Carroll and Patrick Ah Van all scored a try each whilst Ah Van kicked 5 goals and Rhys Hanbury also kicked a goal. Widnes pushed St. Helens very close but due to a last minute try the Vikings lost 24–23. Ah Van scored a hat-trick whilst Chris Dean and Cameron Phelps also crossed. Hanbury kicked 1 goal and slotted a drop goal. Widnes recorded their 5th win of the season against Salford City Reds winning 46–8, Phelps, Ah Van and Hanbury all scored 2 tries each whilst McShane and Danny Craven scored a try. Hanbury kicked 7 goals. Widnes wrapped up July with a 32–26 loss to Hull Kingston Rovers, tries came from Joe Mellor, Stefan Marsh, Kurt Haggerty, Danny Craven and Rhys Hanbury. Hanbury also kicked 3 goals.

August 2012

August started off with a 38–26 loss to Bradford Bulls, former Bull Patrick Ah Van scored 2 tries and kicked a goal, Rhys Hanbury also scored a try and kicked 2 goals whilst Ben Davies and Danny Craven also scored. Widnes were on the wrong end of a bad scoreline losing 68–24 to champions Leeds Rhinos. Stefan Marsh scored 2 tries, Frank Winterstein and Cameron Phelps also scored whilst Ah Van kicked 4 goals. Widnes recorded their 6th win of the season with an outstanding 42–16 over Hull FC. Shaun Briscoe and Willie Isa both scored 2 tries whilst Paddy Flynn, Winterstein, Craven and Hanbury all scored a try each. Craven kicked 2 goals and Paul McShane added a further 3 to seal the victory.

September 2012

Widnes started September with a 22–18 loss to Wakefield Trinity Wildcats. Rhys Hanbury scored twice and Paddy Flynn also crossed the line. Hanbury kicked 2 goals whilst Paul McShane also added a goal. Widnes finished bottom after a 52–14 loss to Warrington Wolves, Frank Winterstein, Paul McShane and Rhys Hanbury all scored tries and Hanbury added a goal.

Squad

Transfers

In

Out

Pre season

Friendlies

Vikings score is first.

Appearances
Pre season friendlies

Season

Stobart Super League

Table

Fixtures and results

Player appearances

Challenge Cup

Fixtures and results

Vikings score is first.

Player appearances
Challenge Cup

Statistics

Team

Team stats will be here.

Squad

 Appearances and points include (Super League, Challenge Cup and Play-offs) as of 15 September 2012.

 = Injured
 = Suspended

References

External links
Bradford Bulls Website
Widnes Vikingson Sky Sports
Widnes on Super League Site
BBC Sport-Rugby League

Widnes Vikings seasons
Widnes Vikings